Julie Fletcher (born 28 September 1974) is a former English footballer, and former England international player. A full-back comfortable on either flank, Fletcher began her career with ten years at Millwall Lionesses.

Fletcher was a member of the England squad for the 1995 FIFA Women's World Cup, having made her debut in a 4–0 defeat to Sweden in May 1995. She was also selected for the 2001 UEFA Women's Championship. Fletcher was England's regular left–back until the emergence of Rachel Unitt.

After joining Croydon in 1997, Fletcher won the Premier League twice and the FA Women's Cup once, before Croydon came under the auspices of Charlton Athletic in 2000. She quit Charlton for Arsenal in December 2001, in the aftermath of a huge squad bust-up. In November 2003 Fletcher returned to Charlton, turning out against Arsenal in that season's FA Women's Cup final.

Honours 

Millwall Lionesses
FA Women's Cup: 1991

References

1974 births
Living people
English women's footballers
England women's international footballers
Arsenal W.F.C. players
Charlton Athletic W.F.C. players
Millwall Lionesses L.F.C. players
FA Women's National League players
1995 FIFA Women's World Cup players
Women's association football midfielders